Jarjapata (possibly from Aymara k'ark'a crevice, fissure, crack, pata step) is mountain in the Vilcanota mountain range in the Andes of Peru, about  high. It is located in the Cusco Region, Quispicanchi Province,  Ocongate District. Jarjapata lies at the Pacopampa valley southwest of Velacota, northwest of Chuñuna and southeast of Jolljepunco.

References 

Mountains of Cusco Region
Mountains of Peru